Tadeusz Pruszkowski (15 April 1888 – 30 June 1942) was a Polish painter and art teacher, known primarily for his portraits.

Biography 
In 1908, he continued his studies in Paris, where he associated with Polish writers and artists belonging to the Royalist Club, a monarchist organization. He also met his future wife there. After graduating, he travelled to Switzerland and Algeria; returning to Poland in 1911 and helping to create an artists' society known as "Young Art" (Młoda Sztuka). In 1914, he held his first solo exhibition at the "". 

In 1915, all the members of Young Art joined the Polish Legion and the organization's funds were used to provide them with equipment. Pruszkowski adopted the name "Rdza" (rust), was assigned to a unit led by Captain Władysław Belina-Prażmowski and served with a Regiment of Uhlans. During a stay in Volhynia he created numerous portraits of the officers and soldiers which were shown at an exhibition in the Zachęta. In 1917, he became a member of the Reserves and later earned a pilot's license; becoming a lifelong enthusiast for air racing.

In 1922, following the death of Krzyżanowski, he was named a Professor at the School of Fine Arts. He took his students to paint en plein aire in Kazimierz Dolny, where he later built a villa, and his classes were very popular. One of his students was Caziel. He continued to participate in numerous exhibitions, both as exhibitor and organizer. In 1926 he directed a short comedy written by Feliks Topolski called Szczesliwy wisielec, czyli Kalifornia w Polsce (The Happy Hangman, or California in Poland). One of the "stars" was the painter Janina Konarska.

In 1930, he became Rector at the School of Fine Arts; participating in the process that resulted in school being promoted to the Academy of Fine Arts in 1932. During the following years, he was involved in creating several organizations for the promotion of Polish art and wrote essays for various publications. In 1935, he was awarded the "Golden Laurel" of the Polish Academy of Literature. His awards included the Cross of Independence, the Order of Polonia Restituta and the Cross of Merit.

At the outbreak of World War II, he and his wife moved from Kazimierz Dolny to a small apartment in Warsaw and rarely ventured outside. He was arrested in June 1942, for aiding Jews and taken to Gestapo headquarters (now the Mausoleum of Struggle and Martyrdom). After an interrogation, he was in the process of being transferred to Pawiak Prison, when he and another prisoner attempted to escape and were shot. They were buried by people from the nearby Warsaw Ghetto. After the war, his remains were recovered and interred in Powązki Cemetery.

Selected paintings

References

External links 

"Tadeusz Pruszkowski i jego związki z Kazimierzemadeusz Pruszkowski" @ the Kazimierz Dolnym website 
"Prusz portrecista" @ the Kazimierz Dolnym website.

1888 births
1942 deaths
People from Łęczyca County
People from Kalisz Governorate
19th-century Polish painters
19th-century Polish male artists
20th-century Polish painters
20th-century Polish male artists
Polish portrait painters
Academic staff of the Academy of Fine Arts in Warsaw
Polish Legions in World War I
Recipients of the Order of Polonia Restituta
Golden Laurel of the Polish Academy of Literature
Polish people executed by Nazi Germany
Executed people from Łódź Voivodeship
Burials at Powązki Cemetery
Polish male painters
Polish civilians killed in World War II